The World of Ch!pz is the second album from the Dutch pop group Ch!pz. It was released on 11 March 2005, in the Netherlands, but in 2006 in Austria, Switzerland, and Germany.

Track listings
Dutch Version
"One, Two, Three!" – 3:29
"1001 Arabian Nights" – 3:06
"I Wanna See" – 3:16
"Kiss Me" – 3:46
"Rockstar" – 3:10
"Holiday!" – 3:04
"This Is How We Do It" – 3:28
"In the Game (The Football Song)" – 3:11
"It's So Easy (The Best Things in Life Are Free)" (feat. Jaggala) – 3:26
"Rhythm of the World" – 3:57
"Superhero" – 3:36
"The Happy Song" – 3:23

Bonus Tracks on Limited edition

EU Standard

Bonus Tracks on Limited EU edition

New Edition

Charts

Weekly charts

Year-end charts

Singles

Year-end positions

References

2005 albums
2006 albums
Ch!pz albums
Universal Music Netherlands albums